The Edersee, also known as the Ederstausee, is an  reservoir in Waldeck-Frankenberg, Hesse, Germany with  of storage space. It has the 2nd largest area (behind the Forggensee), and the 3rd largest volume (behind the Bleilochstausee and Rurstausee), of all reservoirs in Germany. It is located on the Fulda Tributary of Eder behind the  Edersee Dam near the town of Waldeck in the Waldeck-Frankenberg district of North Hesse.

The Eder Dam (dam and reservoir) is owned by the Federal Waterways and Shipping Administration, with the Hann. Münden Waterways and Shipping Office being responsible. The primary purpose of the dam is to provide water for the federal waterways Oberweser and Mittellandkanal. It also serves to protect downstream residents from small and medium floods, to generate electrical energy and for recreation.

Situated in the Naturpark Kellerwald-Edersee and the Nationalpark Kellerwald-Edersee and overlooked by Waldeck Castle, Lake Edersee and its surroundings form a large recreational area.

Geographical location 
It stretches from the confluence of the Eder before Herzhausen in the west to the dam wall near Hemfurth-Edersee in the east, and in the south it meets the "Ederhöhen", a mountainous region in the north of the Kellerwald, which is roughly congruent with the Nationalpark Kellerwald-Edersee.

See also 

 Edersee Dam

References 

Lakes of Hesse
Reservoirs in Hesse
REdersee